Te Pēhi Kupe (–1828) was a Māori rangatira and war leader of Ngāti Toa and the uncle of Te Rauparaha. He took a leading part in what became known as the Musket Wars.

He led the force that captured Kapiti Island for Ngāti Toa, then in 1824 managed to brazenly force passage on a ship to England where he was presented to George IV, learned to ride, recorded his moko and had his portrait painted.

On his return journey he sold the various presents he had received in Sydney to purchase arms and ammunition, and was soon part of fellow Ngāti Toa chief Te Rauparaha's 1828 raids on the South Island. After sacking the pā at Kaikoura and Omihi they went further south to the major Ngāi Tahu pā at Kaiapoi, where they wished to trade.

Learning that Te Rauparaha intended to attack them in the morning,  and being aware of the attacks on their people at Kaikoura, the Kaiapoi people attacked the Ngati Toa. Te Pēhi was one of three Ngāti Toa chiefs killed as they slept overnight there, and this incident led to the revenge raids by Te Rauparaha in 1830 with the capture of Tama-i-hara-nui from Takapūneke near present-day Akaroa and the three-month successful siege of Kaiapoi and sacking of Ōnawe the next year.

See also
 Ngāti Toa
 Te Rauparaha
 Musket Wars

References

1795 births
1828 deaths
Musket Wars
Ngāti Toa people